Lloyd James Allinson (born 7 September 1993) is an English professional footballer who plays a goalkeeper for Scarborough Athletic.

Career

Huddersfield Town
Allinson joined Huddersfield Town at under-10 level from Rothwell Town, and made his first appearance on the first-team substitute bench in October 2010. He spent two loan spells at Ilkeston during the 2011–12 and 2013–14 seasons. He was a regular on Huddersfield's first-team bench during the 2014–15 season.

He made his senior début for Huddersfield on 7 May 2016 in their 5–1 home defeat against Brentford. He was released by the club at the end of the 2015–16 season.

Chesterfield
On 4 August 2016, Allinson signed a six-month contract at Chesterfield after featuring for the club during pre-season. Allinson made his Chesterfield debut on 30 August 2016 in a 2–1 win against Wolverhampton Wanderers U23 in the opening round of the EFL Trophy. On 7 February 2017, Allinson extended his contract with the club until the end of the season. He was released at the end of the season.

Non-league
In July 2017 he joined FC United of Manchester. He was under contract with the club until May 2019.

In March 2019 he joined Nantwich Town on loan.

On 3 August 2019, Allinson joined Guiseley. After spending time with Ashton United, he signed for Gainsborough Trinity in November 2019.

Allinson signed for Hyde United in January 2020, making eight appearances in all competitions.

In August 2020 he joined Scarborough Athletic.

Career statistics

References

1993 births
Living people
People from Rothwell, West Yorkshire
English footballers
Huddersfield Town A.F.C. players
Ilkeston F.C. players
Chesterfield F.C. players
F.C. United of Manchester players
Nantwich Town F.C. players
Guiseley A.F.C. players
English Football League players
Association football goalkeepers
Ashton United F.C. players
Gainsborough Trinity F.C. players
Hyde United F.C. players
Scarborough Athletic F.C. players